Flicker and Flames is the debut extended play from Australian psychedelic rockers, the Silents, released on 6 March 2006 by Rubber Records through EMI. The EP was co-produced by Dave Parkin (Red Jezebel) and the group. Its lead track and debut single, "Nightcrawl", received significant airplay across Triple J networks.

Track listing
All songs written by Benjamin Stowe, Sam Ford, James Terry and Alex Board.

 "Nightcrawl" – 2:50
 "High Blues" – 3:08
 "Gypsy" – 2:00
 "Little People" – 2:57
 "Mind in a Blanket" – 8:51

References

2006 debut EPs
The Silents albums